Pitomba may be either of two kinds of fruit tree native to South America:

Eugenia luschnathiana, a flowering plant in the family Myrtaceae
Talisia esculenta, a medium-sized tree native to the Amazon Basin